Symphonie pour le jour où brûleront les cités (French: Symphony for the day when the cities will burn; originally released as Art Zoyd 3) is the debut album of Art Zoyd, released in 1976 through AZ Production Michel Besset. In 1981, the entire album was re-recorded and released on Atem Records. Re-issues of both versions of the album in 2008 contain different bonus tracks.

In 1992, the 1981 re-recording would be reissued as a double compact disc with Musique pour l'Odyssée, Génération sans futur and Archives 1.

Track listing

Original 1976 recording

1981 re-recording

Personnel 
Art Zoyd
Alain Eckert – guitar, percussion, vocals
Gérard Hourbette – violin, viola, flute
Jean-Pierre Soarez – trumpet, percussion
Thierry Zaboitzeff – bass guitar, percussion, vocals
Production and additional personnel
François Artige – engineering
Michel Besset – production
Jean-Pierre Grasset – engineering
H2L Publicité Valenciennes – design

References

External links 
 

1976 albums
Art Zoyd albums